Abu Abdallah Muhammad XII (c. 1460–1533), known in Europe as Boabdil (a Spanish rendering of the name Abu Abdallah), was the 22nd and last Nasrid ruler of the Emirate of Granada in Iberia.

Sultan
Muhammad XII was the son of Abu l-Hasan Ali, Sultan of the Emirate of Granada whom he succeeded in 1482, as a result of both court intrigue and unrest amongst the population at large.

Muhammad XII soon sought to gain prestige by invading Castile, but was taken prisoner at Lucena in 1483. Muhammad's father was then restored as ruler of Granada, to be replaced in 1485 by his uncle Muhammad XIII, also known as Abdullah ez Zagal.

Muhammad obtained his freedom and Christian support to recover his throne in 1487, by consenting to hold Granada as a tributary kingdom under the Catholic monarchs. He further undertook not to intervene in the Siege of Málaga, in which Málaga was taken by the Christians.

Following the fall of Málaga and Baza in 1487, Almuñécar, Salobreña and Almería were taken by the Christians the following year. By the beginning of 1491, Granada was the only Muslim-governed city in Iberia.

Surrender of Granada
In 1491, Muhammad XII was summoned by Isabella I of Castile and Ferdinand II of Aragon to surrender the city of Granada, which was besieged by the Castilians. Eventually, on 2 January 1492, Granada was surrendered. The royal procession moved from Santa Fe to a place a little more than a mile from Granada, where Ferdinand took up his position by the banks of the Genil. A private letter written by an eyewitness to the Bishop of León only six days after the event recorded the scene:

The Moorish sultan, with about eighty or a hundred on horseback and very well dressed, went forth to kiss the hand of their Highnesses. According to the final capitulation the key to Granada will pass into Spanish hands without Muhammad XII having to kiss the hands of Los Reyes, as the Spanish royal couple Isabella and Fernando became known. The indomitable mother of Muhammad XII insisted on sparing her son this final humiliation of kissing the hand of Isabella.

Christopher Columbus seems to have been present; he refers to the surrender:

After your Highnesses ended the war of the Moors who reigned in Europe, and finished the war of the great city of Granada, where this present year 1492 on the 2nd January I saw the royal banners of Your Highnesses planted by force of arms on the towers of the Alhambra.

Exile

Legend has it that as Muhammad XII went into exile, he reached a rocky prominence which gave a last view of the city. Here he reined in his horse and viewed for the last time the Alhambra and the green valley that spread below. The place where this allegedly took place is today known as the Suspiro del Moro, "the Moor's sigh". Muhammad mourned his loss, and continued his journey to exile accompanied by his mother.

Muhammad XII was given an estate in Laujar de Andarax, Las Alpujarras, a mountainous area between the Sierra Nevada and the Mediterranean Sea. He crossed the Mediterranean in exile, departing in October 1493 from Adra and landing in Cazaza. He settled in Fes, accompanied by an entourage of 1,130 courtiers and servants. Large numbers of the Muslim population of Granada had already fled to North Africa, taking advantage of a clause in the articles of surrender that permitted free passage.

Letter to the Marinid Sultan of Morocco
Shortly after his surrender, Muhammad Boabdil sent a long letter to the Marinid rulers of Morocco asking for refuge. The letter begins with a long poem praising the Marinids, followed by a prose passage where he laments his defeat and asks forgiveness for past wrongdoings of his forefathers against the Marinids. The entire text was reported by al-Maqqari:

North African exile and death
The 17th-century historian Al-Maqqari wrote that Muhammad XII crossed the Mediterranean to Melilla then went to Fes where he built a palace. He stayed there until his death in 1533/1534 (in 940 A.H.). He was buried near the Musala (place of the special prayer during the Islamic festivals) located outside of "Bab Sheria" in Fes. Muhammad XII was survived by two sons; Yusef and Ahmed. Al-Maqqari met with his descendants in 1618 in Fes; they lived in a state of poverty and relied on the Zakat.

An alternative final resting place for Muhammad XII is suggested by the late nineteenth century Arabist M.C. Brosselard, who translated a lengthy prescription in Andalusian script on a three-foot long onyx slab held in the town museum of Tlemcen. This epitaph marked the tomb of the exiled king our lord Abu-Abdullah who died in Tlemcen in May 1494, aged thirty-four. The conflict between places and dates of death may arise from confusion between Muhammad XII and his uncle El Zagal, who also died in North African exile.

Spanish chronicler Luis del Mármol Carvajal wrote "Muhammad XII died near the Oued el Assouad (Black River) at ford told Waqûba during the war between the Marinids and the Saadians." This source is also taken by Louis de Chénier, a diplomat of King Louis XVI of France, in his Historical research on the Moors and History of the Empire of Morocco published in Paris in 1787.

Muhammad XII in popular culture

 He is a main character in John Dryden's The Conquest of Granada, a heroic drama in two parts, 1672.
 He is mentioned often by Washington Irving in Tales of the Alhambra (1832), particularly in the chapter "Mementos of Boabdil."
 He was the subject of the three-act opera Boabdil, der letzte Maurenkönig, Op. 49, written in 1892 by the Jewish-German-Polish composer Moritz Moszkowski.
 Spanish composer Gaspar Cassadó wrote the Lamento de Boabdil for cello and piano, in memory of the king.
 Spanish composer Antón García Abril wrote the 'Elegía a la pérdida de la Alhambra' from his song cycle Canciones del Jardin Secreto for voice and piano; it is set to text (in Andalusian Arabic) that is attributed to Boabdil, in which he laments the loss of the Alhambra.
 Abu Abdallah appears as the main character in "De Ongelukkige" published in 1915 by Dutch author Louis Couperus. This novel covers the last decade of Abu Abdallah's reign as ruler of the Emirate of Granada.
 In the 1931 anthology If It Had Happened Otherwise, the alternate history scenario "If the Moors in Spain Had Won" by Philip Guedalla has the premise of Boabdil winning the war against the Spanish, and his kingdom persisting into the 20th century.
 He figures in the video game Assassin's Creed II: Discovery for the iOS and Nintendo DS, as an ally of the Assassins.
 He is portrayed by Khalid Abdalla in the film Assassin's Creed (2016).
 Andalusian singer-songwriter and poet  dedicated a song to Muhammad XII in his album Crónicas Granadinas, entitled Caída del Rey Chico.
 Salman Rushdie's book, The Moor's Last Sigh, also features consistent references to Muhammad XII.
 He appears as a character in Leo Africanus by Amin Maalouf.
 Louis Aragon's book Le Fou d'Elsa renders a dramatized and poetic version of the story of Granada's capture, which includes Muhammad XII as one of the two main characters present in the novel, (Majnun being the other. Elsa, whom it could be argued is the second major character, is absent from the book.).
 Pakistan Television Corporation (PTV) produced a drama in 1980, based on the novel "Shaheen" by Nasim Hijazi. In this drama Abu Abdullah Mohammad was played by Shakeel Ahmed.
 Also in 1980 (22 November until 7 February 1981), appeared in the comics supplement to the Portuguese newspaper A Capital a 12-page comics story on the conquest of Granada with Boabdil as the main character, Luz do Oriente ("Light of the Orient"). The script was by popular literature writer and bookman Jorge Magalhães and the drawing was by Portuguese-Guinean sculptor, painter and comic book artist Augusto Trigo.
 Boabdil appeared as main character in the Spanish eight-episode serial Requiem por Granada (1991). In this serial, he was played by Manuel Bandera. Young Boabdil was played by Lucas Martín.
 Boabdil appeared as a main character in season two of the Spanish TV Series Isabel (2013). In this show, he was played by Álex Martínez.
 He appeared as a main character in the novel Court of Lions (2017) by Jane Johnson.
 He appears as a character in G. Willow Wilson’s novel, The Bird King (2019), which is set during 1491 and the arrival of the Spanish Inquisition. The protagonist Fatima is his concubine.
 Nathaniel Mackey's poem "Sigh of the Moor" in Splay Anthem is built around the motif of Boabdil’s abdication.
 Keith Bradbury's novel "Let the Dead Hold Your Hand" features the story of Boabdil and the search to find his final resting place.
 He appears in The Queen’s Vow, a novel of Isabella of Castile by C.W. Gortner.
 He appears in the E.T.A Hoffmann short story "Das Sanctus" or (The Sanctus" as the antagonist.

See also
 Al Andalus
 Alhambra Decree
 Reconquista
 Treaty of Granada

Further reading

References

|-

|-

Sultans of Granada
15th-century monarchs in Europe
1460s births
16th-century deaths
People of the Reconquista
15th-century people from al-Andalus
Nasrid dynasty
People from Granada
15th-century Arabs
16th-century Arabs